Events from the year 1643 in art.

Events
 (unknown)

Works

Sébastien Bourdon – A Brawl in a Guard-room (Dulwich Picture Gallery; approximate date)
Alonzo Cano – Ideal portrait of a Spanish King
Jan van Goyen – An Evening River Landscape with a Ferry
Cornelius Johnson – Major-General Sir William Waller
Rembrandt
The Artist's Wife, Saskia (Gemäldegalerie, Berlin)
Landscape with a Castle (Musée du Louvre)
Portrait of an Old Man (or The Old Rabbi; Woburn Abbey, England)
The Three Trees (etching)
Diego Velázquez – Self-portrait (Uffizi; approximate date)

Births
7 December - Giovanni Battista Falda, Italian engraver especially of contemporary and antique structures in Rome (died 1678)
date unknown
Juan de Alfaro y Gamez, Spanish painter of the Baroque (died 1680)
Giovanni Battista Buonocore, Italian painter (died 1699)
Filippo Gherardi – Italian painter of frescoes (died 1704)
Ludovico Gimignani, Italian painter, active mainly in Rome, during the Baroque period (died 1697)
Luigi Quaini, Italian painter of landscapes and architecture (died 1717)
Pandolfo Reschi, Polish-born Italian painter of battle scenes and landscapes (died 1699)
Orazio Marinali, Italian late-baroque sculptor, active mainly in Veneto (died 1720)
Gottfried Schalken, Dutch painter (died 1706)

Deaths
April - Abraham Bosschaert, Dutch painter (born 1612)
December 30  - Giovanni Baglione, Italian painter and historian of art (born 1566)
date unknown
Jean Chalette, French miniature and portrait painter (born 1581)
Belisario Corenzio, Italian Mannerist painter (born 1558)
Guillaume Dupré, French sculptor and medallist (born 1574)
Cornelis Jacobsz Delff, Dutch painter (born 1570)
probable
Cheng Jiasui, Chinese landscape painter and poet during the Ming Dynasty (born 1565)
Ottavio Vannini, Italian painter of altarpieces and churches, active mainly in Florence (born 1585)

References

 
Years of the 17th century in art
1640s in art